El Hadji Omar Brancou Badio (born 17 February 1999), nicknamed "Papi", is a Senegalese professional basketball player for Baxi Manresa of the Liga ACB. He also plays for the Senegal national basketball team.

Early life and career
Badio was born in Rufisque, Senegal and played for Saltigué in his hometown, competing at the senior level by the age of 15. His older sister Marietou had played for Saltigué. He was named Revelation Player of his league in 2018. Badio moved to Spain to join Canarias Basketball Academy and played for its affiliated team La Matanza in the Liga EBA.

Professional career
For the 2019–20 season, Badio signed with FC Barcelona. He averaged 13.4 points per game while shooting 40 percent from three-point range for the club's reserve team in the LEB Plata. He declared for the 2020 NBA draft. On 20 September 2020, Badio made his senior debut for Barcelona, scoring three points in seven minutes in an 89–86 win over San Pablo Burgos.

On 24 September 2021, Badio signed a one-year contract with German club Skyliners Frankfurt, with the option for another season. He averaged 10.6 points, 2.3 rebounds and 3 assists in 26 minutes per game for the Skyliners.

On 10 May 2022, Badio returned to Spain when he signed with Manresa for the remainder of the 2021–22 season.

National team career
Badio played four games for the Senegal national team during 2019 FIBA Basketball World Cup qualification. Badio also played at AfroBasket 2021, where he averaged 17.3 points and 5.5 assists as the team's starting point guard.

References

External links
Liga ACB profile

1999 births
Living people
Bàsquet Manresa players
FC Barcelona Bàsquet B players
FC Barcelona Bàsquet players
People from Rufisque
Point guards
Senegalese expatriate basketball people in Spain
Senegalese men's basketball players
Shooting guards
Skyliners Frankfurt players